This is a list of the largest airlines in Asia by fleet size and total passengers carried in a twelve-month period. The table is updated periodically as and when new monthly data are available. Figures are for individual airlines; aggregate figures for airline groups (airlines and their partners/subsidiaries related by full equity ownership) are shown only when they are officially published. The list excludes companies headquartered on the Asian side of Russia, Turkey and Azerbaijan.

By passengers carried (millions)

Notes
 Includes figures for Shanghai Airlines and China United Airlines.
 Includes figures for Shenzhen Airlines (including Kunming Airlines), Air Macau and Dalian Airlines.
 Includes figures for Thai AirAsia, Indonesia AirAsia, Philippines AirAsia, AirAsia India, AirAsia X and Thai AirAsia X.
 Includes figures for Chang An Airlines, China Xinhua Airlines and Shan Xi Airlines.
 Based on Fiscal Year ending 31 Mar.
 Includes figures for Batik Air, Wings Air, Batik Air Malaysia and Thai Lion Air.
 Includes figures for Dragonair.
 Includes figures for J-Air and JAL Express.
 Includes figures for Scoot and SilkAir.
 Includes figures for Air Japan, ANA Wings and Vanilla Air.
 Includes figures for Citilink.
 Includes figures for Air India Express and  Alliance Air.
 Includes figures for Jin Air.
 Includes figures for Cebgo.
 Includes figures for Thai Smile.
 Includes figures for Air Busan.
 Includes figures for PAL Express.
 Includes figures for Mandarin Airlines.
 Includes figures for Firefly and MASwings.
  Includes figures for JetKonnect.
 Based on Fiscal Year ending 31 Mar.

References

Asia
 Largest
Airlines of Asia